Le fils de la femme male is a novel by Ivorian author Maurice Bandaman. It won the Grand prix littéraire d'Afrique noire in 1993.

Ivorian novels
1992 novels
French-language novels
Grand prix littéraire d'Afrique noire winners